The women's 800 metres event at the 2018 African Championships in Athletics was held on 4 and 5 August in Asaba, Nigeria.

Medalists

Results

Heats
Qualification: First 2 of each heat (Q) and the next 2 fastest (q) qualified for the final.

Final

References

2018 African Championships in Athletics
800 metres at the African Championships in Athletics